Matron Irene Melville Drummond (26 July 1905 – 16 February, 1942) was an Australian Army nurse during the Second World War. She was the most senior-ranking among the 22 Australian nurses killed in the Bangka Island massacre on 16 February 1942.

She was mentioned in dispatches in 1946 for gallant and distinguished service in Malaya in 1942. Her last recorded words, uttered in a whisper as she and her colleagues were being marched into the sea to be shot, were "Chin up, girls. I'm proud of you and I love you all."

See also
Clarice Halligan, also killed in the Bangka Island Massacre
Vivian Bullwinkel, sole survivor of the Bangka Island Massacre

Citations 

1905 births
1942 deaths
Australian Army personnel of World War II
Australian military nurses
Australian prisoners of war
Australian women nurses
Female wartime nurses
Women in the Australian military
Women in World War II
World War II nurses
World War II prisoners of war held by Japan
Australian military personnel killed in World War II